The Ghaist's Warning is a Scottish ballad based on Robert Jamieson's translation of the Danish ballad Svend Dyring (DgF 89; TSB A 68). It was published by Sir Walter Scott in the notes to The Lady of the Lake in 1810. Scott describes the ballad as being written not in the common language of the time, but in the "old Scottish idiom" such as to produce a more literal translation.

The ballad describes a group of children who are abused by their evil stepmother after the death of their biological mother; the dead mother then rises from the grave to warn against their mistreatment.

The Saturday Review praised Svend Dyring, arguing that the ballad, "with its combination of intense pathos and high imaginative power, stands alone, we are inclined to think, in the ballad-literature of Europe."

In literature 

In Emily Brontë's 1847 novel Wuthering Heights, Ellen (Nelly) Dean sings a portion of the ballad to Hareton Earnshaw, though the lyrics are somewhat different from those published by Scott. Henry Wadsworth Longfellow published a short story based on the ballad as The Spirit Mother.

Recordings

A version of the ballad has been recorded by Danish harpist Niss Stricker.

Lyrics

References

External links 
 

Scottish ballads
Wuthering Heights
Henry Wadsworth Longfellow